Han Hyun-jun is a South Korean business executive and engineer, currently serving as the President and CEO of TaeguTec, the largest metalworking company in Asia.

References

1960 births
Living people
South Korean businesspeople